Donald Francis Reese (September 4, 1951September 18, 2003) was an American football defensive end who played in the National Football League and the United States Football League. He played professionally for the Miami Dolphins, the New Orleans Saints and the San Diego Chargers and the Birmingham Stallions of the USFL.

Biography
Reese was born in Mobile, Alabama and graduated from Vigor High School in Prichard, Alabama. He played college football at Jackson State University. 

Reese was a 1st round selection (26th overall pick) of the 1974 NFL Draft by the Miami Dolphins. He would go on to play for the Dolphins (1974–1976), the New Orleans Saints (1978–1980), and the San Diego Chargers (1981). In 1985 Reese played for the Birmingham Stallions in the United States Football League.

Reese was suspended for the final four games of the 1980 season by interim coach Dick Stanfel for instigating a fight during a practice with teammate Derland Moore. Stanfel was conducting his first practice session as Saints coach after taking over for Dick Nolan, who was fired after the Saints fell to 0-12 in a loss to the Los Angeles Rams on Monday Night Football. New Orleans finished 1-15, becoming the first NFL team to lose 15 games in a season.

In June 1982, Reese penned an extensive piece for Sports Illustrated in which he detailed his struggles with drugs.  This was one of the first looks into the seedy world of money and drug use in the NFL.  .

Reese was named the Jackson State All-Century Team and was inducted into the JSU Athletic Hall of Fame

Reese died in Mobile, Alabama at the age 52 from liver cancer.

References

External links

 

1951 births
2003 deaths
Sportspeople from Mobile, Alabama
Players of American football from Alabama
American football defensive ends
Jackson State Tigers football players
Miami Dolphins players
New Orleans Saints players
San Diego Chargers players
Deaths from liver cancer
Deaths from cancer in Alabama
Vigor High School alumni